Irish Linen is the tenth of the Nuala Anne McGrail series of mystery novels by Roman Catholic priest and author Father Andrew M. Greeley.

2007 American novels

Nuala Anne McGrail series
Novels by Andrew M. Greeley
Forge Books books